Tappy Phillips (born February 5, 1948) is an American news correspondent for ABC News and was a Consumer Affairs reporter for WABC-TV in New York from 1996 to 2009. Phillips joined Eyewitness News in 1985.

She has exposed exploitative talent agencies, cleared up a stalled worker's compensation case and got a disabled bus driver a needed back operation and a right to work.

Phillips won an Emmy Award for her coverage of the Bensonhurst trial verdict, a Long Island Folio Award, and a New York State Broadcasters Award for her report on Plum Island, among others. In addition to her reporting for Eyewitness News, Phillips is also a freelance photographer with work published in the New York Times and Esquire.

Phillips graduated from the University of Iowa with a BA in mass communications and philosophy.

Recently, Phillips has followed a doctor from Bensonhurst, New York who has refused to give his patients their mammograms. For over eleven months, Phillips and WABC has continued to investigate the culprit, Dr. Florentine and his brother. On July 23, it was reported that the doctors were arrested, all without returning the mammograms to the women.

On the November 20, 2009 5PM newscast of Eyewitness News, it was announced that Phillips would retire.  A segment honoring her was aired on the newscast.

References

External links
 WABC-TV Bio

1948 births
American television journalists
Consumer rights activists
Living people
Television anchors from New York City
University of Iowa alumni
Place of birth missing (living people)